Lyric Shen (born 1993) is an American artist based in Los Angeles, California.  Shen is a sex workers' rights activist.

Notable Art 
Shen was featured in art exhibitions such as Jupiter Finger, hosted by Real Pain Los Angeles and Wall Sits by the art collective Kunstverein München.  The artist uses the mediums of movement, ceramic, paper, metal, and tattoo art. 

Shen produced a collage and painting series, a four-page spread in collaboration with volume two of the All Sex Workers Go to Heaven collective zine. Shen's ceramic piece, crafted using soda-fired stoneware, S. Flower Tray, was displayed at an art exhibition at Kunstverein München in 2019. The artist's metalwork, Jewel Stand, was exhibited at Jupiter Finger. The base of Jewel Stand is crafted from steel, and the central tabletop section is created from resin, clay, condoms, and plant matter.

References

External links 
 Website

Wikipedia Student Program
1993 births
Living people
Sex worker activists in the United States